The Euskotren 3150 series is a railcar train type formerly operated by Euskotren in the Basque Country, Spain. Originally built in the 1960s by Ferrocarriles Vascongados, the series was retired from passenger service in 1997. A refurbished unit, known as Trenbiker, is operated by Euskal Trenbide Sarea as a track geometry car.

History
Starting in 1942, railway operator Ferrocarriles Vascongados gradually rebuilt some of its wooden passenger cars in metal. With the acquired experience, the company decided in 1958 to build its own rolling stock in its Durango maintenance facilities. In total, four railcars were built, the first one entering service in 1962 and the last one in 1967. The electric components were built by General Electric Española and the bogies by Alsthom. After Ferrocarriles Vascongados was merged into FEVE in 1972, the trains were renumbered as the 3150 series, keeping their original order. When Euskotren was established to operate narrow gauge services in the Basque Country, they were transferred to the new company.

In 1984, train 3153 was damaged in a fire, and was later scrapped. In 1985, the first two trains were refurbished and had their interiors adapted for suburban services. In their final role, the trains were painted in a white and green color scheme, which gained them the nickname "Kiwis". The 3150 series trains were retired from passenger service in 1997 due to lack of capacity.

In 1999, train 3151 was converted into a track geometry car, known as Trenbiker. Since 2006 Trenbiker has been operated by Euskal Trenbide Sarea, a company established to manage the tracks on which Euskotren trains run. Train 3152 served as a relief train for some years, before being scrapped in 2007, while train 3154 has been preserved by the Basque Railway Museum.

See also
 Euskotren rolling stock
 Ferrocarriles Vascongados § Rolling stock

References

External links
 

Railcars of Spain
3150
Ferrocarriles Vascongados rolling stock
3150
Train-related introductions in 1962
Track recording trains